Adinfern Estate is an Australian winery at Cowaramup, in the Margaret River wine region of Western Australia.  Established in 1996, it was previously a sheep farm, and before that a dairy farm.

The founders and owners of Adinfern Estate were Merv and Jan Smith. 
They sold the property in 2017.

See also

 Australian wine
 List of wineries in Western Australia
 Western Australian wine

References

Notes

Bibliography

External links
Adinfern Estate – official site

Companies established in 1996
Cowaramup, Western Australia
Wineries in Western Australia
1996 establishments in Australia